Abietinella is a monotypic genus of cnidarians belonging to the family Zygophylacidae. The only species is Abietinella operculata.

The species is found in near Antarctica.

References

Cnidarians